Tulcus tigrinatus is a species of beetle in the family Cerambycidae. It was described by James Thomson in 1868. It is known from Brazil, Ecuador, French Guiana and Peru.

References

tigrinatus
Beetles described in 1868